Dead of Winter is a 1987 American horror thriller film, directed by Arthur Penn and starring Mary Steenburgen, who plays three roles. It is a loose remake of the 1945 film My Name Is Julia Ross, itself inspired by the 1941 novel The Woman in Red.

Plot 
On New Year's Eve, a woman retrieves a satchel full of cash from a train station's locker and drives into an empty parking lot. Once there, she calls someone and says on the phone that she will wait only a few more minutes. After she gets back in her car, a man in the backseat strangles her and removes her left ring finger.

In New York City, struggling actress Katie McGovern lives in a cramped apartment with her out-of-work husband, Rob Sweeney. The couple is behind on rent and other bills, and Katie tries to get an acting job to help them financially.

At an audition, she is interviewed by a Mr. Murray, who hires her immediately. The pair drive upstate into the midst of a snowstorm and arrive at the secluded home of Dr. Joseph Lewis, a wheelchair-bound parapleigic. Katie asks to use the phone to call Rob, but finds it has no dial tone. Dr. Lewis surmises the storm must have downed the lines.

Dr. Lewis explains that Katie has been hired to replace Julie Rose, an actress who had a nervous breakdown during a film shoot. She was picked due to her remarkable physical resemblance, as the plan is to still use the footage shot with Julie with new film of Katie. The following day, Mr. Murray cuts and dyes Katie's hair to match the photos of Julie.

The next morning, Katie finds a notebook with Polaroids of Julie's corpse. Horrified, she confronts Dr. Lewis, who explains that Julie's breakdown ended with her suicide. In the parlour, Katie sees her driver's license burning in the fireplace. Unable to retrieve it, she rushes to her room and finds all her ID is missing from her wallet. Katie flees the house without a coat, but the weather is ferocious. She ends up crawling to the top of a hill and, to her horror, bumps into Mr. Murray.

Back at the house, Dr. Lewis says her imagination is running wild. Katie realizes that Mr. Murray has drugged her hot chocolate. In her room, she barricades the door with furniture before she passes out. As she sleeps, Mr. Murray enters her room from behind a mirror. Katie wakes up in a sleeping gown with a bandaged hand. Peeling off the bandages, she finds her left ring finger has been removed and screams in horror.

Her barricade undisturbed, Katie quickly finds the secret door to the attic, which has a working phone. She calls Rob and explains that they are going to kill her. Rob asks where she is, but Katie can only remember vague landmarks along the drive upstate. She then calls the police. As she collapses, she sees the body of Julie Rose.

As Dr. Lewis redresses her finger, he explains that Julie was involved in a vicious family feud with her sister, Evelyn. As a radical therapy, Dr. Lewis convinced her to blackmail her sister, theorizing that it would help her achieve a catharsis. Being pleased with Julie's progress, he did not expect Evelyn to kill her, ordering a hit man to take her finger as proof.

During his explanation, the police arrive. Katie is confused from a sedative and Dr. Lewis claims that she is his patient, so the police leave without much of an investigation. Meanwhile, Rob and Katie's brother Roland drive upstate, using the handful of clues they have to try to locate Katie.

Evelyn then arrives to the house. Dr. Lewis offers Katie as proof that Julie is still alive, to continue the blackmail. Katie fakes an escape attempt, luring Dr. Lewis and Mr. Murray out of the house. She pleads with Evelyn to help her escape, but Evelyn is convinced that she is really Julie and attacks her. Katie kills Evelyn and poses as her to try to escape.

Mr. Murray realizes the ruse, but Katie stabs him in the neck. Dr. Lewis is also not fooled by the disguise and chases Katie into the attic, where she manages to kill him. Rob and Roland arrive with the police, having convinced them to revisit the house.

Cast 

 Mary Steenburgen as Julie Rose / Katie McGovern / Evelyn
 Roddy McDowall as Mr. Murray
 Jan Rubeš as Dr. Joseph Lewis
 William Russ as Rob Sweeney
 Ken Pogue as Officer Mullavy
 Wayne Robson as Officer Huntley
 Mark Malone as Roland McGovern
 Michael Copeman as Highway Patrolman
 Sam Malkin as Gas Jock
 Pamela Moller as Woman at audition
 Dwayne McLean as Killer
 Paul Welsh as New Year's Eve reveler

Production 
Despite the credits, Arthur Penn was not the film's original director. Co-writer Marc Shmuger, a classmate and friend of Penn's son Matthew Penn, began directing, but soon ran into difficulties. Producer John Bloomgarden took over directing in the interim. Studio executive Alan Ladd, Jr. asked Arthur Penn, who had initially brought the project to the studio's attention, to direct. Penn reluctantly agreed.

Dead of Winter was filmed on location in Ontario, Canada.

Release
Metro-Goldwyn-Mayer released the film on VHS and DVD on December 3, 2002. The film debuted on the Blu-ray format for the first time on January 10, 2017. The disc was released by Shout Factory under their spin-off label Scream Factory. Aside from the restoration, the disc has one new special feature, an interview with lead actress Mary Steenburgen. The disc has since gone out of print.

Reception

Critical response 
Dead of Winter has a 77% Fresh rating on Rotten Tomatoes from 13 reviews. In Janet Maslin's review for The New York Times, she wrote, "When a director approaches Gothic horror with this much enthusiasm, the results are bound to be as merry as they are frightening. So audiences for Arthur Penn's Dead of Winter are in for a hair-raising treat." Roger Ebert gave the film two and a half out of four, and concluded that, "The movie itself is finally just an exercise in silliness – great effort to little avail – but the actors have fun with it, the sets work and there are one or two moments with perfect surprises."

Writing for The Washington Post, Paul Attanasio stated that Steenburgen "manages with élan an assignment that has her playing three parts". He faulted the lengthy build-up to the final confrontation, specifying, "An hour's worth of exposition is a long wait, and if the payoff isn't quite worth it, it is fun. After nine yards of soggy oatmeal, you're reintroduced to the pleasures of an old-fashioned haunted house." The staff review of the film in Variety found Rubeš to be lacking as the villain, writing, "Steenburgen and McDowall are the adversaries to follow, even though it would seem more likely that the wheel-chair bound doctor (Jan Rubeš) should be the one to watch. Rubeš is simply not sinister enough to be the mastermind behind this scheme."

References

External links 

1987 films
1987 horror films
1980s psychological thriller films
Remakes of American films
American horror films
Films about actors
Films directed by Arthur Penn
Films scored by Richard Einhorn
Films set in New York (state)
Films shot in Ontario
Metro-Goldwyn-Mayer films
1980s English-language films
1980s American films